The Changan UNI-K is a mid-size crossover SUV made by Changan from 2020.

Overview

The Changan UNI-K is the second product of its freshly unveiled UNI-series, following the UNI-K compact crossover. The UNI-K was first previewed by the Changan Vision-V Concept unveiled at the 2020 Beijing Auto Show in September 2020, and was rumored to be called the UNI-V before the official reveal.

The production version of the fuel version Changan UNI-K was introduced at the 2020 Guangzhou Auto Show with a price range of RMB 145,900 ($22,920) to RMB 184,900 ($29,050).

Powertrain
The UNI-K has a turbocharged 2.0-liter engine that gives . It is also equipped with an eight-speed automatic transmission by Aisin and all-wheel drive system.

UNI-K iDD
The Changan UNI-K iDD is the plug-in hybrid version of the regular UNI-K. Presale started in January 2022 with a price range between RMB 176,900 ($27,700) and RMB 192,900 ($30,000). The UNI-K iDD is Changan's first model to be equipped with Changan's Blue Whale iDD hybrid system. The iDD is aimed to contribute to fuel saving and low consumption rather than electromobility and was first teased with the UNI-K iDD crossover prototype at the 2021 Chongqing Auto Show. The Blue Whale iDD hybrid system includes a 1.5-litre turbocharged four-cylinder engine with an electric motor and a Blue Whale three-clutch electric drive gearbox resulting in a maximum horsepower of 170 horsepower with a peak torque of 260N·m plus the maximum electric motor horsepower of 116 horsepower and a peak torque of 330N·m. The NEDC pure electric cruising range of the UNI-K iDD is 130 km, and the comprehensive cruising range is 1100 km. The battery capacity is 30.74kWh and additionally the UNI-K iDD is equipped with a 3.3 kW high-power external discharge function.

In the Russian market
In October 2021, the model was certified in Russia and received vehicle type approval, it was supposed to enter the market in early 2022, even pre-orders were opened (unofficial prices for the model ranged from 2.7 to 3.5 million rubles), in June 2022, the car became available in car dealerships, but at a listed price of 5.5 million rubles.

References

UNI-K
Cars introduced in 2020
2020s cars
Mid-size sport utility vehicles
Crossover sport utility vehicles
Front-wheel-drive vehicles
Cars of China